Gorsko Ablanovo is a village in northern Bulgaria. It is located in Opaka Municipality in Targovishte Province.

Population
Gorsko Ablanovo has suffered from the general population decline that has affected the whole country.

History
On August 24, 1877, in between Gorsko Ablanovo and Katselovo there was a major battle of the Russo-Turkish war of 1877-78. The Ottoman forces commanded by Mehmed Ali Pasha and Sabit Pasha, consisted of about 27,000 soldiers, 50 cannons with reserves of 12,500 soldiers and 31 guns and outnumbered the Russian troops commanded by Crown Prince Alexander Alexandrovich and Major-General Alexei Timofeev who had 10 battalions and 50 guns. The Ottoman army won the battle but not the war. The Russian losses were 1301 killed and wounded, the Ottoman losses are unknown.

Eventually the area was liberated from Ottoman control which led to the Treaty of Berlin, which in turn was instrumental in creating the Principality of Bulgaria which, in 1908, officially declared independence and formed the Kingdom of Bulgaria after 512 years of Ottoman rule.

Today the area around Gorsko Ablanovo is a mixture of forests and farmland, the climate is temperate, with cold snowy winters and hot dry summers.

References 

Villages in Targovishte Province